The 1998 Kärcher Canadian Junior Curling Championships were held January 24-February 1 at the Calgary Curling Club and the North Hill Curling Club in Calgary, Alberta.

Men's

Teams

Standings

Results

Draw 1

Draw 2

Draw 3

Draw 4

Draw 5

Draw 6

Draw 7

Draw 8

Draw 9

Draw 10

Draw 11

Draw 12

Draw 13

Playoffs

Tiebreaker

Semifinal

Final

Women's

Teams

Standings

Results

Draw 1

Draw 2

Draw 3

Draw 4

Draw 5

Draw 6

Draw 7

Draw 8

Draw 9

Draw 10

Draw 11

Draw 12

Draw 13

Playoffs

Semifinal

Final

Qualification

Ontario
The Ontario Junior Curling Championships were held in Oshawa, with the finals on January 11. 

After posting a 7-0 round robin record, the Ottawa Curling Club's Jenn Hanna rink had to be beaten twice by the Bluewater club's Susan Keeling for the women's championship. Hanna won the first game 11-2, clinching the championship. 

In the men's final, John Morris (also of the Ottawa Curling Club) defeated Sarnia's Jason Young in the final. Morris had to win a tiebreaker match against Barrie's Ryan Werenich, before beating St. Catharines' Greg Balsdon in the semifinal to get there.

References

External links
Men's statistics
Women's statistics

Canadian Junior Curling Championships
Canadian Junior Curling Championships
1998 in Alberta
Curling competitions in Calgary
January 1998 sports events in Canada
February 1998 sports events in Canada